The Qoba Mosque (known also as Ghoba Mosque) is a Mosque in Tehran, with a view of the Alborz Mountains to the north. It is located on Ghoba (Qoba) Street between Negin Street and Khushak Street.

The mosque was closed by the Shah in 1975 because of Mohammad Mofatteh's political teachings.

Responding to Mir Hossein Mousavi's appeal, Iranian government legally approved a Sunday June 28, 2009, (or Tir 7th 1388 Anno Persico) peaceful prayer gathering at 6pm mourning those killed during the 2009 post-election clashes at the Qoba Mosque (or Ghoba Mosque) on Ghoba Alley  (North of Hosseinie Ershad Mosque on Doktor Ali-ye Shariati) in Tehran.

See also
 Islam in Iran

Mosques in Tehran